Bee (in Piemontese Bé) is a commune of 623 inhabitants in the Province of Verbano-Cusio-Ossola in the Italian region Piedmont.

There is also the residential village of Montelago.

Bee borders the following municipalities: Arizzano, Ghiffa, Premeno, Vignone.

References

External links

Official website

Cities and towns in Piedmont